Nikolay Varbanov (born June 6, 1985) is a Bulgarian professional basketball player. He currently plays for  Spartak Pleven of the Bulgarian Basketball League. He plays the center position. He stands 2.09 m in height. Varbanov is a member of Bulgaria national basketball team.

Awards and Achievements 

Bulgarian Cup Semifinals -04, 08, 11
Bulgarian League Semifinals -04, 06, 08, 11
Bulgarian U20 National Team -05
European Championships U20 Div.B in Varna -05 (Champion): 8 games: 4.4ppg, 3.3rpg
Bulgarian National Team -05-07, 08, 10-11-13
Bulgarian League All-Star Game -07, 11
Bulgarian Cup Finalist -07, 09, 13
Bulgarian League Regular Season Runner-Up -08
Bulgarian League Regular Season Champion -09, 10
Bulgarian League Champion -09, 10
Bulgarian University National Team -09
European Championships in Lithuania -11: 5 games: 2.8ppg, 2.4rpg
Estonian Cup Finalist -12

References

Eurobasket profile
http://www.yambolbasketball.com/players/players2010-11/player-varbanov11.php
http://www.bgbasket.com/en/player.php?id=120
Levski Sofia Profile Page

1985 births
Living people
BC Yambol players
BC Kalev/Cramo players
BC Levski Sofia players
BC Balkan Botevgrad players
Bulgarian men's basketball players
Expatriate basketball people in Estonia
PBC Academic players
People from Lyaskovets
Centers (basketball)
Sportspeople from Veliko Tarnovo Province